Apokolips is a fictional planet that appears in American comic books published by DC Comics. The planet is ruled by Darkseid, established in Jack Kirby's Fourth World series, and is integral to many stories in the DC Universe. Apokolips is considered the opposite of the planet New Genesis.

Apokolips is a large planet covered entirely by a city (an ecumenopolis). It is a notoriously dismal place, where the slavish Hunger Dogs (low-class citizens) labor endlessly to feed the Energy Pits which supply light and power to the world. Both Apokolips and New Genesis exist in a different plane of existence from the regular DC Universe, located near the Source that originated the Old and New Gods.

Apokolips represents a failed society. As Jack Misselhorn writes: "No one on Apokolips evolves spiritually because there is no love. It is a stagnant society, its inhabitants living in ignorance, the legacy of oppression".

Accessing either Apokolips or New Genesis usually requires a form of travel known as a "Boom Tube", a portal generated by a device known as a Mother Box. In some versions, the boom tube actually converts the size of individuals that pass through to proportions fitting the destination, i.e., when a New God passes from Apokolips (or New Genesis) to Earth, they shrink in size, while someone going the other way would grow larger. If someone somehow reaches the Fourth World by other means, they will discover that its denizens are giants.

Fictional history
Apokolips and its bright counterpart New Genesis were spawned by the destruction of Urgrund, the world of the "Old Gods" (implied to be the gods of Norse mythology). While New Genesis was given strength and nobility from the "living atoms" of the Old God Balduur, Apokolips was saturated with evil from an unnamed sorceress. The two planets are locked in an eternal war, symbolizing the struggle of evil and good on a grand mythic scale. Apokolips is ruled by a fell being known as Darkseid, a dark leader who rules over his downtrodden people by force and fear. Apokolips appears to be a high-tech industrial ecumenopolis.

Seven Soldiers

Both Apokolips and New Genesis were seemingly destroyed in a final battle prior to Grant Morrison's miniseries Seven Soldiers: Mister Miracle. However, the final issue of that series implied that the story's earlier events were merely visions seen by the hero as part of an elaborate test by the New God Metron. How much of the battle really happened and the current status of the New Gods remains to be seen.

Countdown to Final Crisis

Using Boom Tube technology, Brother Eye arrives on Apokolips and seemingly assimilates the entire planet. Before the assimilation is fully complete, the Pied Piper intervenes and channels the Anti-Life Equation through his flute. This destroys much of Brother Eye, causing its central core to make a last-minute escape off the surface of the planet and reverting much of Apokolips to what it was.

Death of the New Gods

At the end of the Death of the New Gods miniseries, with all the gods now dead, the combined entity born from the melding of the Source and the Anti-Life Equation merges Apokolips and New Genesis into a single new planet with characteristics in common with both the former worlds.

The Great Darkness Saga

In the 30th century, original Legion of Super-Heroes continuity, Apokolips is inactive and Darkseid incapacitated. In the reboot Legion continuity, Darkseid was aged and dying, with the planet mostly uninhabited, but the center of a large cult.

The New 52: Earth-0 and Earth-2
In DC continuity following its 2011 Flashpoint event and the launch of its New 52 line of comics, the DC Multiverse remains composed of 52 worlds, but only one set of New Gods. Darkseid and his army from Apokolips has attempted to invade Earth-0, or Prime Earth, but is repelled by the first incarnation of the Justice League. At the same time, his armies invaded the alternate Earth of Earth-2 under the aegis of Steppenwolf, which was much more successful.

The invasion of Earth-2 cost the lives of that universe's original Superman, Batman, Catwoman, Wonder Woman and millions of humans, including Earth-2's Lois Lane, married to Superman on that world. The Apokoliptan forces have assistance from Fury (Earth-2 Wonder Woman's abducted and brainwashed daughter), with all her mother's Amazonian abilities. Five years on, a number of new "wonders" begin to emerge: Green Lantern (Alan Scott), the Atom, Hawkgirl, Doctor Fate, the Red Tornado (an android with Lois Lane's consciousness) and the Flash form an embryonic Justice Society to deal with threats such as Solomon Grundy. Before long, the armies of Apokolips attempt a second invasion of Earth 2, and the Wonders of the World are supported by further heroes includes Batman (Thomas Wayne), a new Superman (Val-Zod), the Huntress (Helena Wayne), Power Girl, Aquawoman (Marella), the Accountable (Jimmy Olsen), the New God Mister Miracle, and Earth 0's Mister Terrific.

Agents of Darkseid, such as Glorious Godfrey and Kalibak (in Batman & Robin) and the Apokoliptian Orion (in Wonder Woman), have encountered the heroes of Earth-0 on several occasions, but no full-scale invasions have taken place. Later, in the series Earth 2: Worlds' End, Mister Miracle discovers that Highfather made a deal with Darkseid that the armies of Apokolips could invade Earth-2 and that dimension freely without the intervention of the New Gods of New Genesis, explaining the wild disparity between the fates of Earth-0 and Earth-2. Ultimately, Apokolips itself enters Earth-2's Solar System and consumes Earth-2, transforming the planet into fuel to sustain itself.

DC Rebirth
When Perpetua destroys the Source Wall, one of the side effects is that Apokolips simply vanishes. With Apokolips gone, Darkseid plans to use the Ghost Sector to create a New Apokolips which he will use to invade and conquer the Multiverse.

Inhabitants

The population is a downtrodden lot, including many kidnapped from other worlds before being "broken". The majority of the population are called Lowlies or Hunger Dogs, a bald and fearful race that has no sense of self-worth or value, and yet, in their own way, are just as much gods as those who rule the planet. The Lowlies are subject to constant abuse that ends only with death. Next are the Parademons, who serve as the keepers of order on the planet. Higher above the Parademons are the Female Furies, who are Darkseid's personal guard. They are blessed with unnatural strength and longevity and are either trained for their position in the Furies from birth, or are promoted from the ranks of general Apokoliptian troops. The leaders of the Furies are Granny Goodness, who sports the appearance of a matronly old woman while being the most powerful of the guards, and Kanto, who enjoys a unique position as Darkseid's master assassin. The chief guard, Big Barda, had a third position under Granny which has not been filled since her defection from the group. Deep below Armagetto, the lifeless forms of the Old Gods live on. They are known as the Dreggs.

Apokolips is ruled by Darkseid as its theocratic god/despot, but he delegates most of the actual day-to-day ruling to his counsellor DeSaad. Darkseid has no real contenders for the throne of Apokolips except the bug-like Mantis, although his sons Orion, Grayven and Kalibak are also potential contenders. Darkseid is cursed with Grayven and Kalibak's stupidity and Orion's service in the name of good. Orion once usurped the throne of Apokolips from his father temporarily, until coming to his senses and returning to New Genesis. It is prophesied that Orion will overthrow Darkseid. In Kingdom Come, it is revealed that Darkseid's overthrow will not result in major changes on Apokolips, as Apokolips' evil comes from evil itself rather than from Darkseid.

Geography
There are different locations on Apokolips, a ecumenopolis (a world-city) with burning firepits, extant in between dimensions, occupying a ‘frequency’ somewhere between the physical universe and Hell:

 Armagedda - One of the many filth-strewn districts on Apokolips that is inhabited by Hunger Dogs and patrolled by Parademons.
 Armagetto - The planet's one city and capital home to a dangerous ghetto outside of Darkseid's palace.
 Darkseid's Palace - This is where Darkseid lives.
 The Garden of Hope - The only beautiful place on Apokolips that has plants on it. It is here where the precognitive Pythia resides, guarding Darkseid's oracle. Darkseid tends to visit this area when he gets stressed out.
 Granny Goodness' Orphanage - This is a training facility where Granny Goodness trains the children of Apokolips to become mighty warriors. It is located in the Night-Time Zone of Armagetto.
 The Happiness Home - The Happiness Home is a rectangular fortress is built on a solid rock base in the centre of a shallow crater. It is over 200 feet high and a training school of sorts.
 The Necropolis - The Necropolis is an underground labyrinth located on Apokolips, home to the Dreggs, the last surviving Old Gods. The Dreggs survived the sundering of Urgrund, but were rendered mindless. Below the Necropolis are the Black Ways, a labyrinth which was the prison of Sirius, one of the last few surviving Old Gods, now trapped in the form of a large wolf. Sirius sacrificed himself to save Orion's life, as seen in Orion #10 (March 2001). Powerful artifacts created by the Old Gods have been found in the Necropolis. A sword found in the ruins of Asgaard briefly gave John Hedley superhuman powers, which he used to challenge Orion in New Gods #16 (May 1990). In another expedition, Kalibak discovered the Thunderbelt, a device which increased his strength and durability (and which was a direct homage to Thor's belt of strength). New Genesis also has ruined cities from the time of the Old Gods. Lonar found his mystical war horse Thunderer in one of these ruins. They met the Odin for some kind of business, such as a black lightning market that could be a source for Asgaardian people. 
 The Terrorium -

Technology
Apokolips is on par with New Genesis in terms of technological advancement. With their technology, they are the height of power in most of the universe and are able to devastate galaxies when they choose to use it. Technology from Apokolips is sometimes on par with the technology used by Brainiac. Apokoliptian technology is furthermore the source of unparalleled misery in the universe, as the planet routinely arms evil groups with advanced technology to further its influence (and misery) across the universe. Apokoliptian technology was used by Bruno "Ugly" Mannheim and his organization Intergang in the Superman comics.  It was a deal between Darkseid and Metron which was the cause of the invention of the "Boom Tube" using "Element X", which could only be found on Apokolips. The "Entropy Aegis" armor, used by Steel to defeat Imperiex, was Apokoliptian technology, as was Dmitri Pushkin's second suit of Rocket Red armor.

Other versions

Darkseid/Galactus: The Hunger
During an intercompany crossover, Galactus visited Apokolips, but was unable to feed on the planet, since all of the life force that had dwelled there had either left to New Genesis or had been burned in the fire pits long ago, in essence leaving the planet with no lifeforce and making it too corrupt for him to feed on.

In other media

Television
 The last two seasons of Super Friends featured Apokolips. It was shown in various episodes of Super Friends: The Legendary Super Powers Show and The Super Powers Team: Galactic Guardians.
 Jack Kirby's Fourth World was featured heavily in the final season of Superman: The Animated Series with Apokolips as the primary setting in a few episodes. In the final episode "Legacy", Superman faced Darkseid in battle and actually dethroned him as ruler and freed the people of Apokolips, only to watch the citizens help Darkseid recover from his wounds out of loyalty.
 In the successor series Justice League Darkseid asked for the League's help when the computer Brainiac attacks Apokolips. This is later revealed as a trick to capture Superman so Brainiac can make itself an organic being. Darkseid gains control of Brainiac and tries to use him to solve the Anti-Life Equation, but is killed when Brainiac's asteroid base explodes. In the series continuation, Justice League Unlimited, Apokolips plunged into civil war after Darkseid's death, between two of his generals, Granny Goodness and Virman Vundabar. Vundabar captures Darkseid's oldest son Kalibak, but Kalibak is later imprisoned on Earth. The League hopes that both sides would destroy each other, so that neither of them can threaten Earth or the universe. But when Darkseid was resurrected by Lex Luthor, he returned to Apokolips to reaffirm his rule, quickly ending the civil war. He then orders his forces to attack Earth, so as to get revenge on Superman and later to head to New Genesis. The Apokolipian forces then came upon Earth via Boom Tubes. The Justice League, temporarily allied with the Secret Society of Super Villains, fought against them. When Darkseid and Luthor seemingly perished when they clasped their hands on the Anti-Life Equation, the Apokolipian forces retreated back to their home, with their fate unclear.
 In the series Smallville, Apokolips is referenced when Clark Kent's cousin Kara explains to Oliver Queen that a symbol-like language depicted on a cave's walls is Apokoliptian in nature. The actual planet appears in the series finale, in which Darkseid attempts to crash it into Earth until Clark, who has become Superman, defeats Darkseid and pushes Apokolips back into outer space.
 In the direct-to-video film Superman/Batman: Apocalypse, Apokolips was a featured location where Darkseid had placed Kara Zor-El under his command.
 Apokolips was referenced in the Young Justice episode "Disordered". It eventually appeared in "Endgame", where it was the gathering place for Vandal Savage, Darkseid, G. Gordon Godfrey, and DeSaad.
 Apokolips appears in Justice League Action.
 Apokolips is featured in the Harley Quinn episode "Inner (Para) Demons". The show's titular character and her crew travel there using a stolen Mother Box to seek an audience with Darkseid and gain control of his Parademon army to defend against the GCPD, which they do after she and Doctor Psycho kill Granny Goodness.

Film
 Apokolips appears in Superman/Batman: Apocalypse, Justice League: War, Reign of the Supermen and Justice League Dark: Apokolips War.
 Apokolips is mentioned once by Knockout in Suicide Squad: Hell to Pay.
 Apokolips is indirectly mentioned in Justice League. While explaining the ancient Mother Boxes to Bruce Wayne, Diana Prince explains that the boxes combine to form the Unity, a power that transforms words into the primordial hellscape of Steppenwolf’s birth world, referring to Apokolips. Apokolips  was physically featured in the director’s cut, Zack Snyder's Justice League

Video games
 Apokolips makes a cameo in the video game Superman: Shadow of Apokolips, where Darkseid and Kanto observe Intergang's activities with Superman and Metallo.
 Apokolips is alluded in Justice League Heroes, where Darkseid uses a Mother Box to turn Earth into a "New Apokolips". Superman is kept on Earth to see what has happened to Earth. Once Darkseid is defeated, Zatanna asks the Mother Box to turn Earth back into its original state.
 Apokolips appears in DC Universe Online, being viewable in the exterior of two instances, Happiness Home and Darkseid's War Factory, where you face against many of the Apokoliptians.
 Apokolips is featured heavily in Lego DC Super-Villains as the final battle between Darkseid, his forces and the Justice League and Legion of Doom, as well as an alternate location once the tenth level called “Cooking Up a Deathstorm” is completed.

References

External links
 Cosmic Teams: New Gods
 DCU Guide: Old Gods
 Index to the Earth-1 Fourth World stories

1971 in comics
Fourth World (comics)
DC Comics planets
DC Comics dimensions
Fictional elements introduced in 1971